Misfits is a British science fiction comedy-drama television show, on E4, about a group of young offenders sentenced to work in a community service programme, where they obtain supernatural powers after a strange electrical storm. The show premiered on 12 November 2009 and concluded on 11 December 2013 in its fifth series.

Antonia Thomas, Iwan Rheon, Lauren Socha, Nathan Stewart-Jarrett, and Robert Sheehan are introduced as Alisha Daniels, Simon Bellamy, Kelly Bailey, Curtis Donovan, and Nathan Young respectively. Sheehan left after the second series, replaced in the third by Joseph Gilgun as Rudy Wade. After the third series it was announced that Rheon, Thomas, and Socha had left and would be replaced by new cast members Karla Crome, Nathan McMullen and Matt Stokoe, as Jess, Finn, and Alex respectively. Midway through the fourth series, Stewart-Jarrett left while Natasha O'Keeffe joined the cast as Abbey Smith.

Production 
The first series started broadcasting in the U.K. on 12 November 2009 on E4, and was produced by Clerkenwell Films. The show aired in Australia in 2010 on ABC2, and in New Zealand, it screened on FOUR. In June 2011, it was made available online in the United States via Hulu, where it became one of the service's most-watched series.

Recording for the second series began on 24 May 2010, next to Southmere Lake, Thamesmead, Bexley, Southeast London. The second series aired from 11 November 2010 to 16 December 2010 on E4. A Christmas special, written by Howard Overman, featuring the whole main cast of the first series was broadcast on E4 in December 2010. The first series won the 2010 BAFTA Television Award for Best Drama Series. The third series began airing on 30 October 2011, and ended on 18 December 2011. The fourth series premiered in October 2012, and the fifth in October 2013.

Filming locations 

The show is filmed in south east London, mostly on location around the Southmere Lake in Thamesmead, including the signature shot of the four multi-storey buildings from the roof of the Lakeside Centre and Bexley College. The scenes under the flyover used the M4 at Boston Manor Park, Brentford. Many interiors were filmed in sets built in the old Runnymede campus of Brunel University.

Marketing 
The first series was accompanied by an online viral marketing, on social networking websites such as Facebook and Twitter. For example, in a British first, the characters Simon and Kelly tweeted during the initial transmission of each episode, with the content of the tweets provided by writers Sam Liefer and Ben Edwards, under the direction of lead writer Howard Overman and executive producer Petra Fried. These tweets and other website postings provided additional narrative material, and amongst other things did not ultimately reveal the identity of a key character who appeared only in episode six. Since then other characters have appeared, such as Rudy Wade and Alisha Daniels, as well as a fan-based "observer" character named "That Guy". Additional strategic components included direct-to-YouTube video clips and an online game based on the show.

Cast and characters

Main

Episodes 

The first series comprised six episodes, airing from 12 November to 17 December 2009 on E4. The second series started filming in May 2010 and aired on E4 from 11 November to 16 December 2010. This series had seven episodes, including a Christmas episode.

An exclusive short film, "Vegas Baby!"''', premiered on E4's official website on 15 September 2011, focusing on Nathan's departure. The third series began airing on 30 October 2011 on E4. It introduced new character Rudy (Joe Gilgun) and was eight episodes long. Unlike the first two series, Howard Overman did not write all the episodes, instead writing six of the eight with Jon Brown writing the other two.
Series 4 began on 28 October 2012, introducing new characters Finn, Jess, Greg, Alex and Abbey. This series also saw the departures of Seth and Curtis. Like series 3, Howard Overman penned six episodes and Jon Brown wrote the remaining two. Series 4 came to a close on 16 December 2012.

 Story overview 

 Series 1 (2009) Misfits follows five delinquents on community service at a community centre who are caught outside during a supernatural thunderstorm and who acquire special abilities. Initially, the show focused on five young adults, each gaining a superpower which mirrors their character. Kelly Bailey (Lauren Socha)—constantly judged for her class ("chav")—gains the ability of telepathy, Curtis Donovan (Nathan Stewart-Jarrett)—trying to escape a mistake from his past—can rewind time after experiencing an immense sense of regret, Alisha Daniels (Antonia Thomas)—a woman who is extremely comfortable with her sexuality and body—sends people into a sexual frenzy when they touch her skin and Simon Bellamy (Iwan Rheon)—often ignored or not acknowledged—can become invisible. Nathan Young (Robert Sheehan) appears unchanged.

The group are attacked by their probation officer, Tony, who was driven insane when he acquired his strange powers in the electrical storm, and is accidentally killed by Kelly in self-defence. The main plot of the first series is the five trying to stop anyone else finding out about the death. Tony's replacement, Sally is revealed to be Tony's fiancée, and she suspects that the gang know more than they claim to. Sally's suspicion grows and she forms a relationship with Simon, secretly pretending to like him in order to get information from him about Tony's disappearance. She steals his mobile phone, which has the video of Nathan saying they killed Tony, sees it, and tries to convince Simon to go to the police. When she tries to get away, Simon turns invisible, intentionally unnerves her while doing so, and then accidentally kills her in the struggle for his mobile.

Other subplots of the series involve Nathan living in the community centre after his mother kicks him out of her house, Alisha and Curtis becoming involved in a relationship, Curtis accidentally changing time so he never split up from his ex-girlfriend Sam, Nathan trying to figure out what his power could possibly be, and Simon's sense of loneliness and isolation from the rest of the group.

After disposing of Sally's body, the delinquents discover the Virtue cult, a group of young people who have begun adopting ultra-conservative behaviour. Nathan and Simon discover that this is the fault of Rachel, a conservative young woman who gained the power of suggestion due to the storm. During a struggle on a rooftop, both Rachel and Nathan are killed and the brainwashed youth freed. As his friends mourn, Nathan's power is finally revealed to be immortality as he awakens in his coffin, unharmed and buried alive.

 Series 2 (2010) 
As the gang are approaching the end of their community service, they are stalked by a mysterious masked man who had previously saved Nathan from the Virtue cult. He assists them through dangerous situations and is seemingly aware of events that take place before they happen and saving members of the group on multiple occasions, such as revealing to Kelly that Nathan was still alive, saving Curtis from being strangled to death by a shapeshifter, saving Nathan from a car explosion when taking drugs makes him temporarily mortal, and saving Alisha from a mugger. When Alisha is attacked a second time, she is taken back to the masked man's safe house. It is revealed that he is a time-traveling, future Simon, with whom Alisha falls in love and learns she is to fall in love with the present Simon. Future Simon warns of an unspecified, upcoming crisis and shows that the superpowers will soon become public knowledge – which eventually occurs, only for that timeline to be erased. Future Simon sacrifices himself to save Alisha, prompting Alisha to reveal the truth to present Simon.

Throughout the series, subplots include Nathan discovering his immortality extends to mediumship, Nathan and Kelly's abortive attempt at a relationship, Curtis and Alisha breaking up, Simon slowly becoming more assertive and comfortable with himself, and Curtis starting a relationship with a girl named Nikki, who obtained her teleportation power from a heart transplant.

Three months later, the Misfits give up their powers by selling them to Seth, a former drug dealer with the ability to transfer powers from one person to another. Elliot, a disillusioned priest, purchases several powers from the same dealer including Alisha's and Nikki's, and uses them to pose as a reborn Jesus Christ. While the Misfits are celebrating the fact that they are free from their powers, a follower of "Jesus" holds up the bar where Curtis and Alisha are now working, robs them, and kills Nikki. The Misfits steal the money that Elliot has gathered from his followers so they can purchase their powers back, accidentally killing him while doing so. Curtis attempts to buy his power back so that he can save Nikki from the shooting, however Seth informs him that his power has already been given to an old Jewish man who wanted to kill Hitler and change history. The Misfits use the money to buy new powers from Seth, with Kelly being the first to volunteer.

 Series 3 (2011) 
Simon, Kelly, Alisha and Curtis acquired new powers following their encounter with Seth; Simon can glimpse into the future, Kelly has complete knowledge of rocket science and mechanical systems, Alisha has a form of clairvoyance which allows her to see through the eyes of others and Curtis can change into a woman at will. Nathan is absent, having gone to Las Vegas in the hope that his new ability of magic will make him a millionaire. A young man on community service named Rudy, with the ability to split himself into two separate people based on the different aspects of his personality, meets the gang when he upsets a woman, causing her to use her power to freeze people within proximity in order to wreak havoc on Rudy. Rudy's actions accidentally put Simon, Kelly, Alisha and Curtis back into community service. Major subplots include Simon and Alisha's relationship, Simon's progressive transformation into his 'future self', Rudy's womanising and philandering, Curtis's experimentation as a female, Kelly's infatuation and eventual relationship with Seth, and Seth's obsessive search for a mysterious power. Additional minor plots include Simon being manipulated by a cartoonist with a time altering power and Alisha then pushing him to not become "the man in the mask". Someone with a time travel power fails to kill Hitler, resulting in the Nazis winning World War II, causing an alternate time stream where the misfits are a band of rebels. Rudy contracts a superpower made STD in the confusion of a club, going on a hunt to find the person responsible.

Seth eventually finds what he was looking for, the power of resurrection. He gives it to Curtis in exchange for his sex-change power, after Curtis accidentally impregnates himself. Curtis uses his power to resurrect Seth's ex-girlfriend, Shannon, who died of a drug overdose that Seth feels responsible for. Seth breaks up with Kelly and returns to Shannon but quickly realises that anyone resurrected has an all-encompassing desire for blood, essentially rendering them a zombie. Seth and the gang manage to defeat Shannon and the others infected by the power, resulting in Seth and Kelly restarting their relationship, eventually deciding to travel in order to escape the mayhem of the community centre.

A medium uses his power to inadvertently bring the spirits of Tony, Sally and Rachel back to haunt the gang, with the spirits unable to move on due to having unfinished business. Sally and Tony move on to the afterlife after they reconcile, and Rachel tries to fit in with the culture that she despised by swearing, drinking, trying drugs and having sex, but is unsuccessful. She comes to the realisation that she is back for revenge, slicing Alisha's throat with a Stanley knife and moving on. After Alisha's death, Seth helps Simon to go back in time, allowing Simon to help the gang in the past and resulting in Simon's eventual death in Alisha's arms. Back in the present day, Rudy, Kelly and Curtis agree to keep their heads down and continue their community service.

 Series 4 (2012) 
After Alisha's death and Simon's departure to the past, Kelly and Seth travel to Africa, where Kelly uses her knowledge of mechanical systems to defuse land mines, and end up staying. Curtis and Rudy continue with community service joined by Finn, an anxious telekinetic, and Jess, a snarky, reserved girl with x-ray vision. Major subplots include Rudy and Finn moving into the community centre together, Finn's one-sided infatuation with Jess, Curtis's encounters with Lola, a mysterious woman who claims to be a trainee probation worker, Finn's search for his father, and Jess's relationship with Alex, "From the Bar", a mysterious bartender who spends most of his time looking for his penis, lost as a result of a mysterious power. As a result of his encounters with Lola, Curtis ends up using his resurrection power again, leading to his own infection. In order to stop his increasing thirst for blood, Curtis commits suicide, emotionally affecting Rudy as a result.

After Curtis's suicide, the gang encounters Abbey, a girl who suffers from amnesia as a result of the storm who later joins the group on community service, and Nadine, a nun with a mysterious secret whom Rudy falls in love with. Alex finds and retrieves his penis, but his regained sense of masculinity causes him to cheat on Jess, angering Finn. Nadine's power is eventually revealed to be the ability to inadvertently summon the Four Horsemen of the Apocalypse when surrounded by anger or violence, which she does after witnessing Alex and Finn arguing over Jess. The Horsemen attack the gang and stab Alex when he steps in to protect Jess. Nadine sacrifices herself in order to stop the Horsemen from wreaking more havoc, leaving Rudy heartbroken once more. As a result of the Horsemen's attack, Alex is rushed to the hospital to receive an emergency lung transplant.

 Series 5 (2013) 
As a result of his lung transplant, Alex inherits the power to remove others' powers through sexual intercourse. After breaking and entering the community centre to save the group, he is placed on community service. A major arc of the series sees him coming to terms with his new power, as he learns to use it to help others and become less selfish. Another story arc has Rudy's sensitive emotional duplicate, Rudy Two, joining a support group for those affected by the storm. The group's leader, Maggie, is an older woman with the ability to knit jumpers of the future; her jumpers include a depiction of what Rudy Two believes to be him and a group of powered individuals seemingly using their powers in an act of heroism. Rudy Two becomes obsessed with the first jumper and encounters people whom he believes to be on the jumper, including Sam, a young man with the power to fly, Helen, a young woman with the ability to emit and control electricity, and Karen, a woman with the power to camouflage. The gang run into Tim, a man from Series 2 who sees reality as if it is a video game, who is now struggling to keep his power under control. Abbey begins a relationship with a man called Mark who is trapped inside a tortoise's body, and Rudy and Jess begin a relationship as well. Rudy struggles to tell this to Finn who is trying to get over his crush on Jess.

During the series the gang confronts a group of Satanic scouts, and Finn becomes possessed with the power to convert people to Satanism. As he slowly converts each member of the gang Alex is forced to use his power and remove Finn's Satanic power. Over the course of the series Alex also takes away someone's power that causes accidents to always happen, the power to turn objects inside out, and the power to hypnotise men with the user's breasts. Rudy discovers that his father is affected by a very similar power to his own, as he runs into a very violent duplicate of his father. Abbey discovers that she is the manifestation of a girl named Laura's power to bring imaginary characters to life, thus explaining why she does not remember anything from before the Storm. Rudy Two is the victim of a man who has the power to swap ages, forcing him to the very brink of death, and Finn finds a new love interest who can download her consciousness into other people's minds, trapping them in a virtual world within her computer. Finn also becomes the victim of a young man who can steal the will to live from other people, just as Alex is the victim of a gypsy curse which makes him feel as if he is drowning whenever he refuses to help someone.

On the one year anniversary of the Storm, Rudy Two and Abbey hold a birthday party which unleashes chaos as people begin to realise that ecstasy reverses their powers. All the powers that Alex has taken are placed into one girl, Sarah, while Jess is blinded, and Mark briefly becomes human again. With the powers of Satanic conversion, object inversion and hypnotic breasts, Sarah begins to wreak havoc on the party; killing Mark by turning him inside out and successfully converting all of the gang but Alex to Satanism. With no options left, Alex is forced to kill Sarah by using her new-found power of being accident prone against her. Rudy Two and Helen, who have begun a relationship, are attacked by Tim, who can no longer control his power. Karen saves the duo by stabbing Tim in the back and Rudy Two and all three of them bury him under the flyover before they, along with Sam, agree to become "proper" superheroes.

In the finale, Rudy and Jess are having difficulties in their relationship due to Rudy not being there for her when she needs him. Jess ends up sleeping with a man she meets at the bar, Luke, who uses his power to throw them both forward in time by a year where Jess has had Luke's baby, Leo. Jess demands to be returned to the present and when Luke refuses, escapes his flat to go and find the rest of the gang. In the year gone by, Finn has started working as a trainee probation worker, Alex is still working at the bar and Abbey has been holding a sign for a golf sale that doesn't actually exist. When most of the gang are assembled in the bar and have overcome their shock at Jess's reappearance (they all thought she was dead due to her disappearance), Rudy reappears, looking shabby due to his grooming regimen having gone out the window. Rudy and Jess reconcile with each other and Rudy agrees to love her baby "as though he was [his] own".

Meanwhile, Rudy Two's "Jumper Posse" have gone off the rails and begun to kill people. After a failed attempt on Finn's life, the Misfits assemble to deal with the Rudy Two's delinquent gang. Rudy Two confronts Helen on her betrayal in the community centre but is knocked out by Karen. As the rest of this Misfits gang approach, they are attacked by Sam. Alex grabs onto Sam and takes his power from him via sexual intercourse mid-flight, causing them both to fall. Alex lands in a skip and survives the fall but Sam is less than fortunate, hitting the pavement with immense force. When the gang enter the community centre (except for Jess, who stays outside with Leo), they are then attacked by Karen who uses her camouflage and a knife in tandem with each other. As she is about to kill Alex, Finn uses his telekinesis to launch a piano at her in an unusual display of brilliance. Helen then appears, intent on killing the gang before Rudy Two intervenes. After a brief exchange Rudy Two rejoins Rudy who proceeds to tell Helen that together "they are twice as strong" (although this really has no truth). As Helen readies herself to kill them both, Rudy stalls for time and begins to pee himself, creating a trail of urine from him to Helen. Helen electrocutes Rudy but is fried herself as her electric current travels back to her through Rudy's stream of urine. Helen dies quickly but Rudy lays gravely injured in the gang's arms. Rudy gives Jess a scratch card, having won a quid on it, and tells Jess to look after the baby before dying himself.

The gang bury him and Jess returns to Luke's flat before committing suicide. Luke finds her body and throws them back in time to just before they first met. Jess sees a video from her future self in the bar toilets that tells her of everything that happened. Jess reluctantly has sex with Luke in order to conceive Leo before killing him and reconciling with Rudy. Jess also informs Rudy Two of how the "Jumper Posse" will begin to murder people and Rudy Two shuts down his superhero operations before they begin, opting to go travelling with Helen instead. On the roof of the community centre, with their community service finally over, the Misfits gang agree to become proper superheroes themselves after hearing Jess's story.

 Reception 

 Critical response to Series 1 
British reviews were positive. The Times gave it four out of five stars, calling it "a new union – salty British street humour with whizz-bang special effects" which should "keep E4's core audience happy".
An online review by The Guardian's Richard Vine said that it was "confident enough to operate in its own universe and set up something new" and that it was aimed at slowly presenting us the "real people" behind a seemingly "tabloid stereotype" of the "ASBO teenager", while also noting that the series Skins also used such a technique for their show. The Guardian's print reviewer Tim Dowling was enthusiastic, saying: "Misfits is indeed silly – sillier, even, than it sounds – but it's also brilliant: sharp, funny, dark and, in places, quite chilling. Both the writing and the performances ensure that everything but the preposterous central premise remains entirely believable."The Daily Telegraph called attention to Howard Overman's script which, it said, "sparkled from the off, introducing his posse of social outcasts as a bunch of total losers, but each one distinctively and memorably so. (2009) "

The Irish media were also impressed with the show. The Evening Herald called the debut episode "dark, hilarious, exciting and beautifully produced". It went on to say that "the spark comes from Overman's razor-sharp script, yet a lot of the credit also has to go to the well-chosen young cast, who are uniformly superb."

 Television ratings 

 Series 1 
The first series averaged 707,500 viewers per episode.
{| class="wikitable" style="text-align:center;"
|-
! rowspan="2" style="width:70px;"| Episode
! rowspan="2" style="width:150px;"| Airdate
! colspan="3" style="width:220px;"| Viewers
! colspan="2" style="width:150px;"| Rank
|-
! E4 !! E4+1 !! Total !! E4 !! E4+1
|-
! 1
| 12 November 2009 || 574,000 || 213,000 || 787,000 || No. 4 || No. 9
|-
! 2
| 19 November 2009 || 569,000 || 169,000 || 738,000 || No. 2 || No. 11
|-
! 3
| 26 November 2009 || 592,000 || 88,000 || 680,000 || No. 1 || No. 11
|-
! 4
| 3 December 2009 || 632,000 || 78,000 || 710,000 || No. 5 || No. 11
|-
! 5
| 10 December 2009 || 598,000 || 72,000 || 670,000 || No. 8 || No. 21
|-
! 6
| 17 December 2009 || 592,000 || 68,000 || 660,000 || No. 6 || No. 21
|}

 Series 2 
The second series averaged 1,462,000 viewers per episode.
{| class="wikitable" style="text-align:center;"
|-
! rowspan="2" style="width:70px;"| Episode
! rowspan="2" style="width:150px;"| Airdate
! colspan="3" style="width:220px;"| Viewers
! colspan="2" style="width:150px;"| Rank
|-
! E4 !! E4+1 !! Total !! E4 !! E4+1
|-
! 1
| 11 November 2010 || 1,185,000 || 238,000 || 1,423,000 || No. 1 || No. 5
|-
! 2
| 18 November 2010 || 1,055,000 || 250,000 || 1,305,000 || No. 1 || No. 2
|-
! 3
| 25 November 2010 || 1,119,000 || 251,000 || 1,370,000 || No. 1 || No. 4
|-
! 4
| 2 December 2010 || 1,075,000 || 341,000 || 1,416,000 || No. 1 || No. 2
|-
! 5
| 9 December 2010 || 1,074,000 || 355,000 || 1,429,000 || No. 1 || No. 1
|-
! 6
| 16 December 2010 || 1,201,000 || 392,000 || 1,593,000 || No. 2 || No. 1
|-
! Christmas Special
| 19 December 2010 || 1,420,000 || 278,000 || 1,698,000 || No. 1 || No. 3
|}

 Series 3 
The Third series averaged 1,515,125 viewers per episode.
{| class="wikitable" style="text-align:center;"
|-
! rowspan="2" style="width:70px;"| Episode
! rowspan="2" style="width:150px;"| Airdate
! colspan="3" style="width:220px;"| Viewers
! colspan="2" style="width:150px;"| Rank
|-
! E4 !! E4+1 !! Total !! E4 !! E4+1
|-
! 1
| 30 October 2011 || 1,471,000 || 323,000 || 1,794,000 || No. 1 || No. 2
|-
! 2
| 6 November 2011 || 1,329,000 || 296,000 || 1,625,000 || No. 4 || No. 4
|-
! 3
| 13 November 2011 || 1,176,000 || 322,000 || 1,498,000 || No. 1 || No. 3
|-
! 4
| 20 November 2011 || 1,142,000 || 300,000 || 1,442,000 || No. 1 || No. 3
|-
! 5
| 27 November 2011 || 1,050,000 || 249,000 || 1,299,000 || No. 2 || No. 11
|-
! 6
| 4 December 2011 || 1,246,000 || 252,000 || 1,498,000 || No. 1 || No. 6
|-
! 7
| 11 December 2011 || 1,178,000 || 284,000 || 1,462,000 || No. 1 || No. 6
|-
! 8
| 18 December 2011 || 1,227,000 || 276,000 || 1,503,000 || No. 1 || No. 7
|}

 Series 4 
{| class="wikitable" style="text-align:center;"
|-
! rowspan="2" style="width:70px;"| Episode
! rowspan="2" style="width:150px;"| Airdate
! colspan="3" style="width:220px;"| Viewers
! colspan="2" style="width:150px;"| Rank
|-
! E4 !! E4+1 !! Total !! E4 !! E4+1
|-
! 1
|  || 777,000 || 239,000 || 1,016,000 || No. 2 || No. 6
|-
! 2
|  || 619,000 || 208,000 || 827,000 || No. 5 || No. 9
|-
! 3
|  ||  || 256,000 || 727,000 ||  || No. 4
|-
! 4
|  ||  ||  || 678,000 ||  || 
|-
! 5
|  ||  || 251,000 || 760,000 ||  || No. 9
|-
! 6
|  ||  ||  || 732,000 ||  || 
|-
! 7
|  ||  ||  || 778,000 ||  || 
|-
! 8
|  || 688,000 ||  || 840,000 || No. 9 || 
|}

 Series 5 
{| class="wikitable" style="text-align:center;"
|-
! rowspan="2" style="width:70px;"| Episode
! rowspan="2" style="width:150px;"| Airdate
! colspan="3" style="width:220px;"| Viewers
! colspan="2" style="width:150px;"| Rank
|-
! E4 !! E4+1 !! Total !! E4 !! E4+1
|-
! 1
|  || 616,000 ||  || 804,000 || No.7 || 
|-
! 2
|  ||  ||  || 582,000 ||  || 
|-
! 3
|  ||  ||  || 729,000 ||  || 
|-
! 4
|  || 602,000 ||  || 782,000 || No. 9 || 
|-
! 5
|  ||  ||  || 699,000 ||  || 
|-
! 6
|  ||  ||  || 638,000 ||  || 
|-
! 7
|  ||  ||  || 654,000 ||  || 
|-
! 8
|  ||  ||  || 729,000 ||  || 
|}

 Awards 
Both the series and its writer Howard Overman were nominated in the 'Drama Series' and 'Drama Writer' categories for the RTS Awards in March 2010. The series won the 2010 BAFTA Television Award for Best Drama Series. Lauren Socha has won "Best Supporting Actress" for her part as Kelly. The show was also nominated for "Best Comedy Drama" at the British Comedy Awards in 2011, but lost to Psychoville.

 International broadcast Misfits began airing in the US on Logo TV on 19 July 2012. On 29 October 2012, Misfits started airing exclusively on Hulu for its American audience, immediately following the UK broadcast. The Italian webseries "Freaks!" (the second season of which was also broadcast on television) has partially been inspired by Misfits; this is apparent in some episodes in which Misfits is quoted (there is also a scene set in England with actors dressed with community service suits).

In France, Misfits began airing in November 2010 on OCS Choc, then in May 2012 on TF6 and in November 2016 on Numéro 23. In Québec, the series have been broadcast online since March 2011 on Tou.tv.

In other media

 Potential film 
Work was started on a film in 2013, but it was tabled in 2014.

Overman reportedly wrote a "first draft of a script" to a Misfits feature film. Iwan Rheon, an early member of the cast, has stated that the movie is "quite likely" to happen if they can re-unite the cast, and that he would be an "idiot not to return".

On 18 September 2014, cast member Antonia Thomas reported that the film was probably not going to happen, stating "There was all sorts of talk about it. We read scripts and I think it's now not happening, I haven't heard anything. I think it's just difficult to get everybody together. Everybody is doing such different things. Maybe they think everybody has moved on, I don't know. You never say never but I have not heard anything of it of late". Iwan Rheon later commented: "It looked like it was really going to happen at one stage, but it's gone away now. I don't know exactly why or what's going on. It would've been nice to do for old times' sake. It's been a while now since we did it and it would've been nice to work with [the old cast] again."

 US remake 
An American version was put in development in 2016 at Freeform from a spec script that had been shopped around as early as 2012.

On 6 June 2017, Freeform pressed forward with a pilot. The remake was to follow a similar premise to the original British series. Ashleigh LaThrop, Tre Hall, Allie MacDonald and Jake Cannavale, were cast in the pilot, following the lives of Alisha (LaThrop), Curtis (Hall), Kelly (MacDonald), and Nathan (Cannavale). On 7 July 2017, Charlie Saxton was cast in the role of Simon and Dave Foley was cast as Bernie, a disheveled driver.

It was announced that the show would be produced by Josh Schwartz and Stephanie Savage's Fake Empire Productions. Diane Ruggiero-Wright wrote the adaption and was to serve as showrunner. Victoria Mahoney was to make her directing debut with the pilot episode. Howard Overman, creator of the UK series, and Murray Ferguson, who produced the original version, were also to be involved with the project. Fake Empire executive Lis Rowinski was to serve as co-executive producer.

In November 2018, Vulture'' noted that Freeform had not made any further announcements in over a year, and doubted that the network would find a place for the series in its family friendly programming.

References

External links 

 Clerkenwell Films official site
 Official Website
 
 
 
 

2009 British television series debuts
2013 British television series endings
2000s British comedy-drama television series
2000s British science fiction television series
2000s supernatural television series
2010s British comedy-drama television series
2010s British science fiction television series
2010s supernatural television series
BAFTA winners (television series)
British superhero television series
Channel 4 television dramas
English-language television shows
E4 (TV channel) original programming
Fictional quintets
Serial drama television series
Teen superhero television series
Television series by Clerkenwell Films
Television shows set in London
Youth culture in the United Kingdom